The Ven John Ryves (1593- 1665) was Archdeacon of Berkshire from 1634 until his death.

He became Rector of Tarrant Gunville in 1620; Canon of Sarum in 1625; Rector  of North Moreton in 1634; Rector  of Manston in 1635; and Canon of Winchester in 1660.

He died on 19 August 1665.

References

1593 births
People from Dorset
People from North Moreton
Alumni of New College, Oxford
Archdeacons of Berkshire
1665 deaths